Nestor Cortés Jr. (born December 10, 1994), nicknamed Nasty Nestor and Hialeah Kid, is a Cuban-American professional baseball pitcher for the New York Yankees of Major League Baseball (MLB). He has previously played in MLB for the Baltimore Orioles and Seattle Mariners.

The Yankees selected Cortés in the 36th round of the 2013 MLB draft. Taken by the Orioles in the Rule 5 draft after the 2017 season, he made his MLB debut with them in 2018 before returning to the Yankees. Cortés pitched for the Yankees in 2019 and the Mariners in 2020, rejoining the Yankees in 2021. Cortés was an MLB All-Star in 2022.

Early life
Cortés was born in Surgidero de Batabanó, Cuba. When he was seven months old, his father, Nestor Cortés Sr., won the visa lottery, and they relocated to the United States in the city of Hialeah, Florida. His father had been sentenced to one year in prison after a failed attempt to defect from Cuba in 1992. Nestor Sr. met his wife, Yuslaidy, the following year.

Cortés started playing baseball at the age of four. His father took him to see the Florida Marlins of Major League Baseball play at Pro Player Stadium in Miami Gardens.

Career
Cortés attended Hialeah High School in Hialeah, Florida. He committed to play college baseball at Florida International University.

New York Yankees
The New York Yankees selected him in the 36th round of the 2013 MLB draft. He signed with the Yankees, receiving an $85,000 signing bonus, and made his professional debut that year with the Gulf Coast Yankees of the Rookie-level Gulf Coast League, where he had a 0–1 win–loss record with a 4.42 earned run average (ERA) in  innings pitched. He returned there in 2014, going 1–2 with a 2.27 ERA in 11 games (two starts). Cortés spent 2015 with the Pulaski Yankees of the Rookie-level Appalachian League, where he compiled a 6–3 record with a 2.26 ERA in 12 games (ten starts). In 2016, he pitched for the Charleston RiverDogs of the Class A South Atlantic League, Tampa Yankees of the Class A-Advanced Florida State League, Trenton Thunder of the Class AA Eastern League, and the Scranton/Wilkes-Barre RailRiders of the Class AAA International League, pitching to a combined 11–4 record with a 1.53 ERA in 21 games (12 starts). Cortés played 2017 with Tampa, Trenton, and the RailRiders. where he was 7–4 with a 2.06 ERA in 30 games (13 starts).

Baltimore Orioles
The Baltimore Orioles selected Cortés from the Yankees organization in the 2017 Rule 5 draft. With the Orioles, Cortés competed for a spot on the Orioles' Opening Day roster as either a starting pitcher or relief pitcher. He made the Orioles' Opening Day roster in 2018 as a relief pitcher, and made his major league debut on March 31. Cortés allowed a grand slam to Josh Reddick on April 3, and then a walk with the bases loaded to Curtis Granderson followed by a grand slam by Josh Donaldson on April 9. The Orioles designated Cortés for assignment the next day.

New York Yankees (second stint)
On April 13, 2018, the Orioles returned Cortes to the Yankees. He played in one game for Trenton before returning to Scranton/Wilkes-Barre, combining for a 6–6 record and a 3.68 ERA in 24 games. After the regular season, Cortes played for the Estrellas Orientales of the Dominican Winter League, where he learned how to throw a cut fastball.

The Yankees invited Cortés to spring training as a non-roster player in 2019. He did not make the team and was assigned to Scranton/Wilkes-Barre. The Yankees promoted him to the major leagues on May 9. On June 15, he earned his first major league win, striking out seven batters, and allowing two earned runs in five innings. On June 21, 2019, he was optioned to Triple-A with Aaron Judge coming off the injured list. He was 5–1 with an ERA of 5.67 in 33 games.

Seattle Mariners
On November 25, 2019, Cortes was traded to the Seattle Mariners in exchange for international bonus pool money. In 2020, Cortes gave up 13 runs over  innings pitched. On October 22, 2020, Cortes was outrighted off of the 40-man roster after he was activated from the 60-day disabled list, and elected free agency.

New York Yankees (third stint)
On December 20, 2020, Cortes signed a minor league contract to return to the New York Yankees organization. The Yankees promoted Cortes to the major leagues on May 30, 2021. Throughout the 2021 season Cortes became a favorite of Yankees fans, as his signature mustache, along with his unique style of pitching and many productive appearances garnered him much praise, along with the moniker "Nasty Nestor." He finished the year with 93 innings pitched over 22 games (14 started) to go along with a 2.90 ERA and 103 strikeouts.

Cortes began the 2022 season in the Yankees starting rotation. Cortes threw an immaculate inning against the Orioles on April 16, 2022. Against the Texas Rangers on May 9, Cortes pitched  innings before allowing his first hit. 2022 saw the first All-Star Game appearance for Cortes, where in the bottom of the sixth inning, he registered two strikeouts, a hit by pitch, and a walk in an inning pitched. In November 2022, it was announced that Cortes intended to represent Team USA in the World Baseball Classic in March 2023.

Player profile
He also throws a cutter, slider, changeup and a less common curveball.

Cortés hides the ball well in his wind-up, which helps to alleviate the problems presented by his shorter frame. When throwing a slider or curveball, his arm angle is slightly lower than his four-seam fastball.

Cortés also employs trickery in his wind-up to throw hitters off. He sometimes varies his step timing and sometimes pauses and rocks back and forth in the middle of his wind-up, and occasionally abbreviates his wind-up and releases the ball very quickly.

See also

 List of Major League Baseball annual shutout leaders
 List of Major League Baseball pitchers who have thrown an immaculate inning
 List of Major League Baseball players from Cuba
 Rule 5 draft results

References

External links

1994 births
Living people
People from Mayabeque Province
Hialeah Senior High School alumni
Baseball players from Florida
Major League Baseball pitchers
Baltimore Orioles players
New York Yankees players
Seattle Mariners players
American League All-Stars
Gulf Coast Yankees players
Pulaski Yankees players
Charleston RiverDogs players
Tampa Yankees players
Trenton Thunder players
Scranton/Wilkes-Barre Yankees players
Scottsdale Scorpions players
Estrellas Orientales players
American expatriate baseball players in the Dominican Republic
Cuban emigrants to the United States
Cuban expatriate baseball players in the Dominican Republic